The 2020 Internazionali di Tennis Emilia Romagna was a professional tennis tournament played on clay courts. It was the second edition of the tournament which was part of the 2020 ATP Challenger Tour. It took place in Parma, Italy between 5 and 11 October 2020.

Singles main-draw entrants

Seeds

 1 Rankings are as of 28 September 2020.

Other entrants
The following players received wildcards into the singles main draw:
  Marco Cecchinato
  Lorenzo Musetti
  Giulio Zeppieri

The following players received entry into the singles main draw as special exempts:
  Maxime Cressy
  Denis Istomin

The following player received entry into the singles main draw as an alternate:
  Mitchell Krueger

The following players received entry from the qualifying draw:
  Filippo Baldi
  Hugo Grenier
  Tomáš Macháč
  Alexandre Müller

The following player received entry as a lucky loser:
  Juan Pablo Ficovich

Champions

Singles

 Frances Tiafoe def.  Salvatore Caruso 6–3, 3–6, 6–4.

Doubles

 Marcelo Arévalo /  Tomislav Brkić def.  Ariel Behar /  Gonzalo Escobar 6–4, 6–4.

References

2020 ATP Challenger Tour
2020 in Italian tennis
October 2020 sports events in Italy